Damien is a given name and a surname.

Damien may also refer to:

Damien (play), by Aldyth Morris
"Damien" (South Park episode), the tenth episode of the first season of South Park
Damien (TV series), an American television series based on The Omen
Leonardo Carrera, a professional wrestler who went by the name Damien
Damien High School, a private Catholic all-boys high school in California
Damien Memorial School, a private Catholic all-boys school in Honolulu, Hawaii
Damien Demento (born 1958), stage name of American professional wrestler Phillip Theis
"Damien", a song by New York hardcore punk band Stray from the Path about the Westboro Baptist Church
Damien, the first of professional wrestler Jake "The Snake" Roberts' three snakes
Tropical Cyclone Damien, a tropical cyclone

See also
Damian (disambiguation)